Holenarasipuram Govindrao Srinivasa Murthy was an IOFS officer and a space scientist. He was known as one of the "Seven Pioneers of the Indian Space Programme".<He served at the Machine Tool Prototype Factory (MTPF), Ambernath, and as the first Director of the Thumba Equatorial Rocket Launching Station (TERLS), and the Space Science & Technology Centre, now known as the Vikram Sarabhai Space Centre, of the Indian Space Research Organisation (ISRO). He was awarded Padma Shri in 1969 by the Government of India. He interviewed and recruited A. P. J. Abdul Kalam into ISRO.

References 

Indian Ordnance Factories Service officers
Indian space scientists
Indian scientists
Space programme of India